June Sheldon Jones III (born February 19, 1953) is an American football coach and former player who is currently the Offensive Coordinator of the Seattle Sea Dragons. Jones was the head football coach at the University of Hawaii at Manoa from 1999 to 2007 and was the head football coach at Southern Methodist University (SMU) from 2008 to 2014, before resigning on September 8, 2014. Previously, he coached in the National Football League (NFL): a three-year tenure as head coach of the Atlanta Falcons from 1994 to 1996 and a ten-game stint as interim head coach of the San Diego Chargers in 1998; he also spent  seasons as head coach of the Hamilton Tiger-Cats in the Canadian Football League (CFL). Jones was also formerly the General Manager and Head Coach of the Houston Roughnecks.

Biography

Early life
Jones grew up in Portland, Oregon, the second of four children born to Marilyn and June Jones Jr.

Playing career
Jones played the quarterback position on three college teams: Oregon (1971–1972), Hawaii (1973–1974), and Portland State (1975–1976). It is during his time at Portland State that he was introduced to the run and shoot offense by Mouse Davis. It would be an offense that he would later champion throughout his coaching career.

His two seasons at Portland State resulted in totals of 5,798 yards passing with 50 TD against 20 INT. He became the first quarterback to give the run and shoot legitimacy as a quarterback-friendly offense. In the years prior, Portland State very rarely had success throwing the ball.

1975: 137/235 for 2,280 yards and 25 TD vs 10 INT
1976: 238/423 for 3,518 yards and 25 TD vs 10 INT

Thereafter, he entered professional football, playing for the Atlanta Falcons (1977–1981) of the National Football League and the Toronto Argonauts of the Canadian Football League (1982). In four seasons with the Falcons, Jones completed 75 of 166 passes for 923 yards with three touchdowns and seven interceptions.

Coaching career

Early career
In 1983, Jones started his coaching career as a graduate assistant under Dick Tomey at the University of Hawaii. He then spent two years in the USFL, first as the wide receivers coach for the Houston Gamblers (1984), then as the offensive coordinator for the Denver Gold (1985). Following the demise of the USFL, Jones spent the 1986 season working as an offensive assistant for the Ottawa Rough Riders of the CFL. In 1987, he got his first NFL coaching position serving as the quarterbacks coach on Jerry Glanville's staff with the Houston Oilers. After Glanville was released by the Oilers, he would join the Detroit Lions coaching staff upon the recommendation of Mouse Davis, his college head coach at Portland State who was serving as the team's offensive coordinator.

Atlanta Falcons
Jones reunited with Glanville upon joining the Atlanta Falcons organization in 1991 as its assistant head coach. In 1994, Jones replaced Glanville as the team's head coach, a move that caused a rift between the two. Reportedly, they did not speak to each other for several years thereafter. (Later, in the 2000s, Jones would hire Glanville as defensive coordinator at Hawaii.) As head coach, Jones installed the run and shoot offense he learned under Mouse Davis. Initially, quarterback Jeff George flourished under the system, passing for 3,734 yards and 23 touchdowns in Jones's first year and 4,143 yards and 24 touchdowns his second year. In 1995, Jones's second season as head coach, the Falcons went to the playoffs, losing in the first round to the Green Bay Packers. The following year, the Falcons posted a 3–13 record, leading to Jones's dismissal. Jones's coaching record over three seasons in Atlanta was nineteen wins and twenty-nine losses. He also clashed with quarterback Jeff George during his final season, including a well-publicized and widely broadcast profanity-laced shouting match during a September 22 game against the Philadelphia Eagles. The feud contributed to both men's release by the organization.

San Diego Chargers
Jones returned to coaching when the San Diego Chargers hired him as quarterbacks coach on January 20, 1998. On October 13, 1998, head coach Kevin Gilbride was fired after the sixth game and Jones became the interim head coach. The Chargers won three of ten games coached by Jones, giving him a career NFL coaching record of 22 wins and 36 losses.

Hawaii
Jones joined the University of Hawaii-Manoa football team as head coach, replacing Fred von Appen, who was fired when the team lost 18 games in a row, including all twelve games in the 1998 season. Jones led the Warriors to a 9–4 record and a share of the Western Athletic Conference football championship in the 1999 season, making it the most dramatic turnaround in NCAA football history.  With Jones's success on the field, and media-friendly persona off the field, he instantly became one of the most famous people in Hawaii, with some people making "June Jones for Governor" T-shirts. Reflecting his offensive philosophy, bumper stickers sporting the slogan "June would throw" appeared. These referenced legendary Hawaiian lifeguard Eddie Aikau, of whom it is said, "Eddie would go" (into big surf).

Joe Moore of KHON-TV in Honolulu faulted Jones for discarding long-standing traditions, such as changing music played during home games, and the change in the uniforms and team nickname during his tenure.

During his tenure at Hawaii, he coached five All-Americans, 52 all-conference performers, and 16 NFL Draft picks. In particular, Jones claims to have made a special effort to recruit local talent in his players and coaching staff. One of the most notable of his recruits was quarterback Timmy Chang, who became the all-time NCAA leader in passing yardage.

Jones was injured in a car accident on February 22, 2001, missing the spring season because of his injuries.

Jones negotiated a contract worth $800,016 during the 2004 season, which made him the highest-paid public employee in the state, even though the football team was struggling. The team finished with a 7–5 regular season record and an invitation to the Hawaii Bowl. Half of Jones's $800,000 salary was paid by private donors.

On December 24, 2006, Jones passed Dick Tomey to become the winningest head coach in Hawaii football history (against an all-college schedule) with a 41–24 victory over Arizona State in the 2006 Hawaii Bowl.

Frustrated with what he viewed as a lack of support from the university, Jones opted to leave Hawaii at the end of the 2007 season. After initial reports had him interviewing at SMU, Hawaii officials had offers to raise his salary from $800,000 a year to $1.7 million a year and offered a commitment to improve its facilities; in addition there was an outpouring of support from Hawaii fans, including Gov. Linda Lingle. However, Jones contacted Hawaii on January 7, 2008, and let them know he had decided to accept an offer from SMU. Jones said the work that needed to be done to improve the football facilities and the campus in general would never get done with him still there. He said after all of the broken promises, leaving was the only way to send a message. Jones went 76–41 at Hawaii, including 4–2 in bowls. His teams finished first in the WAC twice and second two other times.

SMU
In a press conference at the Hall of Champions adjacent to Gerald J. Ford Stadium on January 7, 2008, Jones was introduced as the new head football coach at Southern Methodist University. He was the school's fifth coach since the NCAA-imposed "death penalty" in 1987.  Jones signed a five-year contract with SMU, paying him two million dollars annually, and making him the highest-paid coach in Conference USA. He guided the SMU Mustangs to a 1–11 record in 2008.

On November 28, 2009, Jones coached SMU to a win over Tulane, ending the regular season with a 7–5 record, the most SMU victories in a season since the 1980s. The 2009 season included a win over the defending and eventual repeat C-USA champion, East Carolina. The 2009 season also saw Jones utilize the ground game more than in recent seasons. Jones led SMU to its third bowl-eligible season, and to its first bowl game (Hawai'i Bowl) since the 1984 Aloha Bowl and the NCAA-imposed death penalty.  SMU defeated Nevada, 45–10, to finish the season 8–5.  As in 1999, Jones coached his team to the most improved record in Division I football.

In 2010, Jones coached the Mustangs to a .500 season. The Mustangs went 7–7 overall with a conference record of 6–2, helping them clinch the C-USA Western title. The team beat the previous year's C-USA champion, East Carolina, in overtime in the final regular-season game but lost the Conference USA Championship Game in Orlando to UCF the next week. Jones and the Mustangs went to their second consecutive bowl game, the Armed Forces Bowl, losing to the Army Black Knights, 16–14. The game was played at SMU's Gerald J. Ford Stadium because the game's normal venue, Texas Christian University's Amon G. Carter Stadium, was undergoing renovation.

On September 8, 2014, Jones stepped down as coach of the Mustangs, citing "personal issues". Jones led the Mustangs to four straight bowl appearances before finishing 5–7 in the school's first season as a member of the AAC and starting the 2014 season 0–2, losing by a combined total of 88–6.

While at SMU he was publicly questioned about the number of non-native Texas players on the team along with the lack of recruiting that was happening.

High school football
After interviewing for the vacant coaching job at Hawaii, Jones was hired as the offensive coordinator at Kapolei High School in January 2016. In December 2016, Jones was named director of athletics at Saint Louis School and the door was left open for him to step into the football coach's job, if it opened.

CFL
On August 2, 2017, the Hamilton Tiger-Cats hired Jones as an assistant coach. His hiring came after the team lost their first five regular season games of the season (the last of which was a 60–1 blowout). On August 24, 2017, the Ti-Cats named June the new head coach, after Kent Austin stepped down to focus on his duties as vice-president of Football Operations. The Hamilton Tiger-Cats were 0–8 at the time Jones was appointed to head coach.

Jones quickly became embroiled in controversy when he attempted to hire his longtime friend and former Baylor University coach Art Briles as an assistant. Briles had been fired from Baylor for his actions in connection with a major sexual assault scandal at the school. Following a media firestorm, the team reversed the decision to hire Briles.

After taking over, Jones led the Ti-Cats to a respectable 6–4 record for the remainder of the 2017 season. Because of this, the Tiger-Cats removed the interim tag and retained Jones as their Head Coach for the next three seasons.

After an 8–10 season in 2018 (which included a playoff berth), Jones agreed to step aside for the highly sought after Orlando Steinauer to take over as head coach moving forward. Jones initially intended to stay on in 2019 as associate head coach and offensive coordinator but departed May 13, 2019. His record as a CFL head coach is 14–14.

XFL
On May 20, 2019, the XFL confirmed it had hired Jones to serve as its Houston franchise's head coach.

For the 2023 XFL season, Jones signed on as the offensive coordinator for Jim Haslett's coaching staff, with Jones stating that he and Haslett would be coaching the Seattle Sea Dragons.

Coaching style
As an American collegiate coach, Jones's offenses rarely run the ball, favoring a wide-open, pass-heavy offense, the run and shoot approach; however, in 2010 sophomore tailback Zach Line rushed for over 1,450 yards in 14 games, making him the 11th best rusher in the FBS. Jones is also notable for never holding full-contact practices.

Head coaching record

College

Notes

NFL

† Became interim head coach when Kevin Gilbride was fired after the sixth game of the season

CFL

XFL

References

External links

 June Jones Foundation

1953 births
Living people
American football quarterbacks
Atlanta Falcons coaches
Atlanta Falcons head coaches
Atlanta Falcons players
Detroit Lions coaches
Grant High School (Portland, Oregon) alumni
Hamilton Tiger-Cats coaches
Hawaii Rainbow Warriors football coaches
Hawaii Rainbow Warriors football players
High school football coaches in Hawaii
Houston Oilers coaches
Houston Roughnecks coaches
National Football League offensive coordinators
Oregon Ducks football players
Ottawa Rough Riders coaches
Players of American football from Portland, Oregon
Portland State Vikings football players
San Diego Chargers coaches
Sportspeople from Portland, Oregon
SMU Mustangs football coaches
Toronto Argonauts players
United States Football League coaches
San Diego Chargers head coaches